Davide Baiocco  (born 8 May 1975) is an Italian former footballer, who currently plays for Palazzolo as a midfielder.

Career

From Perugia to Juventus 
A product of the Perugia youth system, he transferred to Juventus in January 2002 for 7.2 million euros, in a swap with Fabian O'Neill who went to Perugia. He arrived in the summer of 2002. He signed a four-and-a-half-year contract with Juventus, but failed to settle into the club and has been loaned out several times, to clubs including Piacenza and Reggina.

The return to Perugia 
On 31 August 2004, he was signed by Perugia on loan with option to purchase for a nominal fee.

From Catania to Siracusa 
Due to bankruptcy of Perugia, Baiocco he joined the then Serie B side Catania in August 2005, and helped them gain promotion to the Serie A for the 2006/2007 season. Since then, he has become the captain of the club and has been an influential first team player. He played with Catania until the end of the 2008–09 season.

From 2009 to 2011 he played for Brescia.

In the 2011–12 season, he has played with U.S. Siracusa in Lega Pro Prima Divisione.

On 7 August 2012 Baiocco was signed by U.S. Cremonese. On 17 January 2014 he was signed by Alessandria in a 6-month contract.

Baiocco returned to Siracusa in 2015. The club won promotion to 2016–17 Lega Pro as Siracusa Calcio.

Style of play
Baiocco was a dynamic, energetic, and versatile defensive midfielder, who was known for his tactical intelligence and tackling ability, as well as his ability to carry the ball and push forward from midfield.

References

External links
  

 

Living people
1975 births
Sportspeople from Perugia
Association football midfielders
Italian footballers
A.C. Perugia Calcio players
A.C.N. Siena 1904 players
Alma Juventus Fano 1906 players
Juventus F.C. players
Piacenza Calcio 1919 players
Reggina 1914 players
Catania S.S.D. players
Brescia Calcio players
A.S. Gubbio 1910 players
U.S. Siracusa players
U.S. Cremonese players
U.S. Alessandria Calcio 1912 players
Serie A players
Serie B players
Serie C players
Serie D players
Footballers from Umbria